A Man Called Horse may refer to:

 "A Man Called Horse" (short story), a 1950 short story by Dorothy M. Johnson
 A Man Called Horse (film), a 1970 American-Mexican Western film based on the short story